Simone Calvano (born 11 July 1993) is an Italian professional footballer who plays as a defensive and central midfielder for  club Pro Vercelli.

Club career

Early career 
Calvano joined AC Milan from Atalanta in January 2010. He spent two seasons and a half in the club's under-20 team, being part of the squad who won the Coppa Italia Primavera in 2010, 25 years after the team's last success in the competition.

Calvano made his official debut for the first team on 26 January 2012, coming on as a substitute in a Coppa Italia quarter-finals game against Lazio, which Milan won 3–1.

Hellas Verona 
At the beginning of the 2012–13 season, Calvano was signed by Serie B club Hellas Verona on a loan deal with an option for the co-ownership. During the January transfer window, Verona redeemed the player's co-ownership and sent him on loan to Prima Divisione club San Marino for the remainder of the season.

On 12 January 2019, he joined Padova on loan.

On 26 August 2019, he joined Juve Stabia on loan with an option to buy.

Triestina
On 5 October 2020 he signed a two-year contract with Serie C club Triestina.

Pro Vercelli
On 11 August 2022, Calvano moved to Pro Vercelli on a two-year deal.

International career 
Calvano has made up a total of 12 caps with Italy U-16, Italy U-17, Italy U-18 and Italy U-19 since October 2008.

Career statistics

Club

References

External links 
 Profile at aic.football.it 
 International caps at figc.it 
 
 

Living people
1993 births
Footballers from Milan
Italian footballers
Association football midfielders
Serie A players
Serie B players
Serie C players
Atalanta B.C. players
A.C. Milan players
Hellas Verona F.C. players
A.S.D. Victor San Marino players
U.C. AlbinoLeffe players
U.S. Pistoiese 1921 players
S.S. Teramo Calcio players
A.C. Tuttocuoio 1957 San_Miniato players
A.C. Reggiana 1919 players
Calcio Padova players
S.S. Juve Stabia players
U.S. Triestina Calcio 1918 players
F.C. Pro Vercelli 1892 players
Italy youth international footballers